Babatunde Ogunbanwo is an Anglican bishop in Nigeria: he is the current Bishop of Ijebu-South West.

Ogunbanwo was educated at the University of Ibadan and Immanuel College of Theology, Ibadan.

He was elected as Bishop of Bishop of Ijebu-South West on 29 October 2009 at the Episcopal synod of the Church of Nigeria Anglican Communion held at the Basilica of Grace Apo in Gudu district of the Anglican Diocese of Abuja. He had previously been Dean of the Cathedral of St. Paul in Shagamu.

Notes

Living people
Anglican bishops of Ijebu-South West
21st-century Anglican bishops in Nigeria
University of Ibadan alumni
Alumni of Immanuel College of Theology, Ibadan
Year of birth missing (living people)